The LTV-N-4 was an American experimental rocket, developed by the Naval Ordnance Test Station for the development and testing of large solid-fueled rocket boosters for ramjet-powered missiles. Described as "more powerful than the V-2", a number of test flights were conducted during 1949.

References

Citations

Bibliography

Experimental rockets of the United States
Cold War rockets of the United States